Libyphaenis is a monotypic moth genus of the family Noctuidae. Its only species, Libyphaenis virescens, is found in southern Nigeria. Both the genus and species were first described by George Hampson in 1918.

References

Acronictinae
Monotypic moth genera